Shapira (Shechunat Shapira) is a neighborhood in south Tel Aviv, Israel with a population of 8,000.  It is located south of the Tel Aviv Central Bus Station and extends to the Ayalon Highway in the east, Mount Zion Boulevard in the west, and to Kibbutz Galuyot Street in the south. 

Shapira is home to a large community of migrants and foreign workers. In 2005, it was described as one of the most heterogeneous neighborhoods in Tel Aviv.

History
The neighborhood was founded by Meir Getzl Shapiro, an American Jewish businessman, who immigrated to Palestine (Eretz Israel) in 1922 and bought plots along the seashore.

Shapira is being renovated under the auspices of Project Renewal, a national project to rehabilitate poor neighborhoods. Work is under way on roads, curbs and sidewalks, water infrastructure, sewage and drainage, lighting, communications and landscaping.

References

Further reading
 Neither in Jaffa nor in Tel Aviv: Stories, Testimonies and Documents from the Shapira Neighborhood, Sharon Rotbard

External links
 Social/Cultural Spaces in Southern Tel-Aviv: Shapira Neighborhood

Ethnic enclaves in Israel
Neighborhoods of Tel Aviv